Jordan Nunatak is a nunatak standing between the heads of Rochray Glacier and Cox Glacier in the southwest part of Thurston Island, Antarctica. It was mapped by the United States Geological Survey from ground surveys and U.S. Navy air photos, 1960–66, and was named by the Advisory Committee on Antarctic Names for Joe Jordan of the U.S. Army Aviation Detachment, a helicopter mechanic on the Ellsworth Land Survey in the 1968–69 season.

Maps
 Thurston Island – Jones Mountains. 1:500000 Antarctica Sketch Map. US Geological Survey, 1967.
 Antarctic Digital Database (ADD). Scale 1:250000 topographic map of Antarctica. Scientific Committee on Antarctic Research (SCAR), 1993–2016.

References

Nunataks of Ellsworth Land